B.L.T. is a 1981 long-playing [LP] vinyl music album by Jack Bruce (formerly of Cream), Robin Trower (formerly of Procol Harum) and Bill Lordan (former drummer of Sly and the Family Stone, the Robin Trower Band and Gypsy). This is the first Robin Trower album to feature Jack Bruce on bass and vocals and the last to feature Bill Lordan on drums. It reached number 37 on the Billboard 200 in May 1981.

Track listing
All tracks composed by Robin Trower and Keith Reid, except where indicated.

Side A (CHR 1324-AS):

"Into Money" (Trower) - 2:53
"What It Is" - 3:21
"Won't Let You Down" - 4:22
"No Island Lost" (Trower, Jim Dewar) - 3:48
"It's Too Late" - 3:38

Side B (CHR 1324-BS):

"Life on Earth" (Jack Bruce) - 3:38
"Once the Bird Has Flown"- 3:56
"Carmen" - 3:37
"Feel the Heat" - 2:50
"End Game" - 5:10

Personnel 
 Jack Bruce – bass, guitar, keyboards, vocals
 Robin Trower – guitar, producer
 Bill Lordan – drums
Technical
 Mike Januszkiewicz – assistant producer
 Ben Fenner – engineer, recorder, mixer
 Stephan Galfus – engineer, all Jack Bruce's vocals, except for "Won't Let You Down" and "End Game"
 Peter Wagg – art direction
 Trevor Key – photography

Charts

References

1981 albums
Robin Trower albums
Jack Bruce albums
Chrysalis Records albums